Diana Walsh Pasulka is a writer and professor of religious studies at the University of North Carolina Wilmington and Chair of the Department of Philosophy and Religion.

Biography
Pasulka has a B.A. from University of California, Davis, an M.A. from Graduate Theological Union, Berkeley, and a Ph.D. from Syracuse University.

Her research focuses on religion and technology. Her books include American Cosmic and Heaven Can Wait. Sean Illing at Vox described American Cosmic as not "so much about the truth of UFOs or aliens as it is about what the appeal of belief in those things says about our culture and the shifting roles of religion and technology in it. On the surface, it's a book about the popularity of belief in aliens, but it's really a deep look at how myths and religions are created in the first place and how human beings deal with unexplainable experiences."

Publications

Books
Heaven Can Wait: Purgatory in Catholic Devotional and Popular Culture. Oxford University Press, 2014. .
American Cosmic: UFOs, Religion, Technology. Oxford University Press, 2019. .

Co-edited anthologies
Posthumanism: the Future of Homo Sapiens. Schirmer, 2018. Edited by Pasulka and Michael Bess. .
Believing in Bits: Digital Media and the Supernatural. Oxford University Press, 2019. Edited by Pasulka and Simone Natale. .

References

External links
Pasulka's americancosmic.com site
Pasulka's profile at University of North Carolina Wilmington
Pasulka in conversation with Lex Fridman at YouTube

Living people
University of North Carolina at Wilmington faculty
American writers
American women writers
Religious studies scholars
Syracuse University alumni
Graduate Theological Union alumni
University of California, Davis alumni
Year of birth missing (living people)
Place of birth missing (living people)
American women academics
21st-century American women